Blackgrange railway station was a temporary station that served the village of Cambus, Clackmannanshire, Scotland, in 1852 on the Stirling and Dunfermline Railway.

History 
The station opened in 1852 by the North British Railway. This was a short lived station, only being open in November 1852.

A crossing keeper's house was located to the west of the crossing on the north side. A level crossing still exists on the line which was re-opened in 2008.

References

External links 

Disused railway stations in Clackmannanshire
Railway stations in Great Britain opened in 1852
Railway stations in Great Britain closed in 1852
Former North British Railway stations
1852 establishments in Scotland
1852 disestablishments in the United Kingdom